What's Happening or What's Happenin may refer to:

 What's Happening (album), by Katalyst, 2007
 What's Happening? (EP), by B1A4, 2013
 What's Happening!!, an American television sitcom that aired on ABC from 1976 to 1979
 What's Happening Now!!, a sequel that first aired on ABC from 1985–1988
 "What's Happenin!", a song by Ying Yang Twins
"What's Happenin", a song by Method Man from Tical 0: The Prequel, 2004
"What's Happenin", a song by Juvenile from Reality Check, 2006
"What's Happening?!?!", a song by the Byrds from Fifth Dimension, 1966

See also
What Happened (disambiguation)
"What Is Happening", a song by Alphabeat from their self-titled album (2007)